"Thinking of You" is a song written and performed by American pop rock band Hanson. It was released as the fifth and final single from the band's debut album, Middle of Nowhere (1997), on May 4, 1998. The single was a success in Australia and Finland, reaching number six in both countries, and in New Zealand and the United Kingdom, where it peaked within the top 30. "Thinking of You" was not released in the United States, but in Canada, it peaked at number 10 on the Canadian Singles Chart.

Track listings
All songs were written by Isaac Hanson, Taylor Hanson, and Zac Hanson except "Weird", written by Desmond Child and Hanson.

Canadian CD single
 "Thinking of You" (Middle of Nowhere version) – 3:13
 "Thinking of You" (3 Car Garage version) – 3:10

UK, European, and Australian CD single
 "Thinking of You" (Middle of Nowhere version) – 3:13
 "Thinking of You" (3 Car Garage version) – 3:09
 "River" – 3:46
 "Stories" – 2:34

UK limited-edition CD single
 "Thinking of You" (Middle of Nowhere version) – 3:13
 "MMMBop" (3 Car Garage version) – 5:09
 "Thinking of You" (Dust Brothers version) – 3:13
 "With You in Your Dreams" (3 Car Garage version) – 4:12

Australian mini-CD single
 "Thinking of You" (Middle of Nowhere version)
 "Weird" (South Beach Mix)
 "Weird" (Movo Mix)
 "Weird" (Guitar Mix)
 "Thinking of You" (Dust Brothers Mix)

Personnel
Personnel are taken from the UK limited-edition CD single liner notes.
 Isaac Hanson, Taylor Hanson, Zac Hanson – writing
 Dust Brothers – production
 Stephen Leroni – additional production
 Tom Lord-Alge – mixing

Charts

Weekly charts

Year-end charts

Certifications

Release history

References

1996 songs
1998 singles
Hanson (band) songs
Mercury Records singles
Song recordings produced by Dust Brothers
Songs written by Isaac Hanson
Songs written by Taylor Hanson
Songs written by Zac Hanson